NoFrag is a French reviews website that focuses exclusively on First-person shooters. It's the only French web site specialized on this type of games.

The name of the site is composed with the two English names "No" and Frag, which means to kill someone temporarily in computer games.

Being focused on First-person shooter hardcore gaming, they have sometimes been considered as "elitists" by other gaming websites They are usually around the 20th position by  Alexa for French video game sites

History
NoFrag was founded on March 4, 2001. The site proposed a forum until July 2006, but has now been replaced them by a blogging system.

In 2004, the NoCorp company was founded to earn revenue and support the web site activity from advertising. Since 2005, the site has an average of more than 40000 visits every day.

References

External links
 Web site
 NoFrag history
 Twitter

Internet properties established in 2001
Video game Internet forums
Blog hosting services
Video game news websites
Video game genre websites